Slavica Šuka, married Delibašić, (born 6 August 1959 in Zenica) is a former Yugoslav and Bosnian basketball player.

Personal life
Slavica is a wife of former Yugoslav and Bosnian basketball player Mirza Delibašić.

External links
Profile at sports-reference.com

1959 births
Living people
Bosnia and Herzegovina women's basketball players
Yugoslav women's basketball players
Sportspeople from Zenica
Shooting guards
Olympic basketball players of Yugoslavia
Basketball players at the 1984 Summer Olympics